East Pasco Adventist Academy (EPAA) is a Seventh-day Adventist school for students in grades K-10. It is a part of the Seventh-day Adventist education system, the world's second largest Christian school system. The school is located in Dade City, Florida, United States, north of Tampa.

Location

The campus is located in unincorporated Pasco County, Florida between Tampa and Spring Hill.

Curriculum
In addition to offering a general diploma East Pasco Adventist Academy has a wide variety of classes.

The school's curriculum consists primarily of the standard courses taught at college preparatory schools across the world. All students are required to take classes in the core areas of English, basic sciences, mathematics, aforeign language, and social sciences. Religion classes are mandated on a yearly basis.

The music program includes band, choir, hand-bells, and private lessons.

Spiritual aspect

Students are required to take religion classes each year. These classes cover topics in biblical history and Christian and denominational doctrines. Instructors in other disciplines also begin each class period with prayer or a short devotional thought. The student body gathers every week in the auditorium for an hour-long chapel service. Outside the classrooms there is year-round spiritually oriented programming that relies on student involvement.

List of principals

See also

 List of Seventh-day Adventist secondary schools
 Seventh-day Adventist education

References

External links

Adventist secondary schools in the United States
Schools in Pasco County, Florida
Private elementary schools in Florida
Private middle schools in Florida
High schools in Pasco County, Florida
Private high schools in Florida
Dade City, Florida